Wayne Brightwell (born 2 December 1957) is a Canadian former wrestler who competed in the 1984 Summer Olympics. He was born in Sudbury, Ontario.

References

External links
 

1957 births
Living people
Sportspeople from Greater Sudbury
Olympic wrestlers of Canada
Wrestlers at the 1984 Summer Olympics
Canadian male sport wrestlers
Commonwealth Games gold medallists for Canada
Wrestlers at the 1986 Commonwealth Games
Commonwealth Games medallists in wrestling
Medallists at the 1986 Commonwealth Games